Han Solo: A Smuggler's Trade is a 2016 Star Wars fan film starring Jamie Costa as Han Solo and Cory Daniel as Chewbacca. The film also stars Doug Jones and Kristine Gerolaga. On December 11, 2016, it was released to YouTube. As of February 2023, it has received over 2.7 million views.

Plot
Han Solo is caught cheating in a card game trying to win money so he could pay off Chewbacca's freedom. Solo is kicked out of the cantina where he was playing, but it is revealed that he took an old lightsaber from D'Jharn, the man in charge of the cantina, before making his way to give it to Gyorsho, who is keeping Chewbacca. Gyorsho, however, refuses to release Chewbacca, as "Solo cannot be trusted and Wookiees make for valuable slaves in the spice mining industry." Solo suddenly Force grabs the lightsaber off the table, but Gyorsho pushes him down, causing him to drop the weapon in front of Chewbacca. Within moments, Chewbacca releases himself and kills Gyorsho. Later, Solo reveals to Chewbacca that he used a magnetic wristband to pretend he was using the Force. The duo then walks through the desert, pondering how they will get the Millennium Falcon back.

Cast
Jamie Costa as Han Solo
Doug Jones as Gyorsho
Kristine Gerolaga as D'Jharn
Cory Daniel as Chewbacca
Bernie Bregman as Gork
Christopher Troy as Small Thug
Matt Shadden as Large Thug

Production

Funding
The crowdfunding site, Indiegogo, was utilized to earn funding for the project. By the time the crowdfunding closed, the project garnered over $21,795 US dollars from 408 backers.

Reception
James Whitbrook of io9 called the film, "nifty," and praised Costa's performance. Ethan Anderton of SlashFilm called the film, "rather impressive," praised the production design and Costa's performance, and criticized the aesthetics and visual effects. B. Alan Orange of MovieWeb spoke highly of Costa's performance, and said, "[he] transcends the material here, and actually looks and feels like a young Han Solo." Kevin Fraser of JoBlo.com described the production values as, "decent." Joey Paur of GeekTyrant called the film, "fun and charming," and described it as, "a perfect mix of Star Wars and Indiana Jones." Tom James of Digital Fox Media described the film as, "a delightful little movie."
 Alex Hernandez of Techaeris described it as "...well done and well thought out." John Abbitt of The Unheard Nerd praised Costa's performance, set design, costumes, and music.

References

External links

Fan films based on Star Wars
Films released on YouTube